Ralph Pampena (1934-December 15, 2012) was a longtime Pittsburgh Police leader, who served as Pittsburgh Police Chief from May 22, 1987 – May 17, 1990.  He was a 22-year veteran of the Pittsburgh Police upon taking the oath of Chief.  During 1986-1987 he briefly retired from the force serving as Police Chief of Carnegie Mellon University.

Pampena graduated from Central Catholic High School and the Community College of Allegheny County.  He earned a bachelor's degree in administration of justice and a masters in public administration from the University of Pittsburgh.  Pampena also graduated from the FBI National Academy in Quantico, Virginia.

Chief Pampena died at the age of 78 on December 15, 2012 in suburban Shaler from cancer.

See also

 Police chief
 Allegheny County Sheriff
 List of law enforcement agencies in Pennsylvania

References

External links

Chiefs of the Pittsburgh Bureau of Police
University of Pittsburgh alumni
1934 births
2012 deaths
Central Catholic High School (Pittsburgh) alumni